Coleophora bidens is a moth of the family Coleophoridae. It is found in the United States, including Ohio.

The larvae feed on the seeds of Aster umbellatus. They create a trivalved, tubular silken case.

References

bidens
Moths described in 1940
Moths of North America